Mary Ann McGee (born September 25, 1986) is an American professional boxer. She held the IBF female light welterweight title from 2019 to October 2021 and challenged for the WBC female lightweight title in 2013. As of October 2021, she is ranked as the world's second best active female light welterweight The Ring.

Professional career
McGee made her professional debut on May 20, 2005, scoring a four-round unanimous decision (UD) victory over Jasmine Davis at the Radisson Hotel at Star Plaza Theatre in Merrillville, Indiana.

After compiling a record of 7–0, she faced undefeated Rita Figueroa (9–0, 3 KOs). The fight was stopped and ruled a no contest (NC) in the fourth round of a scheduled eight-round bout after an accidental clash of heads. McGee won her next four fights before facing Tawnyah Freeman for the vacant NABC female lightweight title on October 19, 2007 at the Adam's Mark Hotel in Indianapolis, Indiana. McGee won the fight via fifth-round technical knockout (TKO). After bouncing back with four wins, McGee fought Kristy Follmar (16–1, 9 KOs) for the vacant WBC International female lightweight title. The bout took place on April 25, 2009 at the Civic Center in Hammond, Indiana, with McGee capturing the WBC International female title via majority decision (MD) over ten rounds. Two judges scored the bout 97–93 in favour of McGee while the third scored it a draw at 95–95. She suffered her first career defeat in her next fight by UD over six rounds to Brooke Dierdorff on February 26, 2010. 

McGee won her next three fights before unsuccessfully challenging Holly Holm for the IBA, and WBF light welterweight titles on May 12, 2013 at the Route 66 Casino in Albuquerque, New Mexico. She suffered the second defeat of her career, losing by UD over ten rounds. All three judges scored the bout 100–90 in favour of Holms. 

In her next fight she challenged for her first major world title against the reigning, undefeated WBC female lightweight champion Érica Farías. McGee lost the bout by UD, with the judges' scorecards reading 100–90, 98–90 and 98–91.

She won her next five fights before challenging for her second major world against Ana Esteche on December 5, 2019 at Terminal 5 in New York City. McGee won via TKO in the tenth and final round to capture the vacant IBF female light welterweight title.

Professional boxing record

References

Living people
1986 births
American women boxers
Boxers from Indiana
Sportspeople from Gary, Indiana
Lightweight boxers
Light-welterweight boxers
Welterweight boxers
International Boxing Federation champions